Challeh Khuni (also Romanized as Chālleh Khūnī and Chelleh Khūnī) is a village in Tula Rud Rural District, in the Central District of Talesh County, Gilan Province, Iran. At the 2006 census, its population was 158, in 39 families.

References 

Populated places in Talesh County